The Territory of Illinois was an organized incorporated territory of the United States that existed from March 1, 1809, until December 3, 1818, when the southern portion of the territory was admitted to the Union as the State of Illinois. Its capital was the former French village of Kaskaskia (which is still a part of the State of Illinois). The northern half of the territory, modern Wisconsin and parts of modern Minnesota and Michigan became part of the Territory of Michigan.

History of the area
The area was earlier known as "Illinois Country" while under French control, first as part of French Canada and then in its southern region as part of French Louisiana. The British gained authority over the region east of the Mississippi River from the French, with the 1763 Treaty of Paris, marking the end of the French and Indian War.

During the American Revolutionary War, Colonel George Rogers Clark took possession of the region for Virginia, which established the "County of Illinois" to exercise nominal governance over the area. Virginia later (1784) ceded nearly all of its land claims north of the Ohio River to the Federal government of the United States.

The area became part of the United States' Northwest Territory (from July 13, 1787, until July 4, 1800), and then part of the Indiana Territory. On February 3, 1809, the 10th United States Congress passed legislation establishing the Illinois Territory, after Congress received petitions from residents in the Mississippi River areas complaining of the difficulties of participating in territorial affairs in Indiana Territory. The portions of the Illinois Territory north of what became the State of Illinois were in 1818 annexed to Michigan Territory, and after several administrative arrangements became a part of the Upper Peninsula of Michigan (1837), the State of Wisconsin (1848), and a northern section of the State of Minnesota (1858).

Boundaries
The Illinois Territory originally included lands that became the states of Illinois, Wisconsin, the eastern portion of Minnesota, and the western portion of the upper peninsula of Michigan. As Illinois was preparing to become a state, the remaining area of the territory was attached to the Michigan Territory.

The original boundaries of the Territory were defined as follows:
"...all that part of the Indiana Territory which lies west of the Wabash river, and a direct line drawn from the said Wabash river and Post Vincennes, due north to the territorial line between the United States and Canada..."

Kaskaskia was the territorial capital. The 1810 census showed a population of 12,282.

In the 1810 United States census, 2 counties in the Illinois Territory reported the following population counts:

Officials  
Ninian Edwards served as governor of the territory during its entire existence.  Its secretaries were:
Nathaniel Pope (1809–1816)
Joseph Phillips (1816–1818)

End of the Territory

In 1818, the southern half of the territory was admitted to the United States as the State of Illinois.The northern half, modern Wisconsin and parts of modern Minnesota and Michigan became part of the Territory of Michigan.

See also
Historic regions of the United States
History of Illinois
Illinois Country
Illinois Territory's At-large congressional district
Illinois-Wabash Company
List of governors of dependent territories in the 19th century
List of governors of Illinois
Military Tract of 1812
Territorial evolution of the United States
War of 1812

References

External links

Primary sources
 Act dividing Indiana Territory, 1809
An Act to enable the people of the Illinois Territory to form a constitution and state government, and for the admission of such state into the Union on an equal footing with the original states (April 18, 1818)
Resolution declaring the admission of the state of Illinois into the Union (December 3, 1818)

Secondary sources
Solon J. Buck: Illinois in 1818
Animated Map: Boundaries of the United States and the Several States

 
States and territories established in 1809
States and territories disestablished in 1818
10th United States Congress
Former organized territories of the United States

Pre-statehood history of Illinois
Pre-statehood history of Michigan
Pre-statehood history of Minnesota
Pre-statehood history of Wisconsin